Dusautoir is a surname. Notable people with the surname include:

 Sophie Dusautoir Bertrand (born 1972), Andorran ski mountaineer
 Thierry Dusautoir (born 1981), French rugby union footballer